Jiang Zaidong (born February 1970) is a Chinese diplomat currently serving as Chinese Ambassador to Laos since October 2018.

Biography
Born in February 1970, he joined the foreign service in 1992, and has served primarily in Vietnam. In 2017, he was appointed deputy director of Department of Asian Affairs, he remained in that position until October 2018, when he was appointed Chinese Ambassador to Laos according the National People's Congress decision.

Personal life 
He is married and has a daughter.

References

1970 births
Living people
Ambassadors of China to Laos